Taiwan mazesoba is a dry noodle dish that originated in Nagoya, Aichi Prefecture, and is now considered a Nagoya delicacy. The dish was popularized by the ramen chain Menya Hanabi in 2008.

See also
Japanese cuisine
Mazesoba

References

Japanese noodle dishes
Japanese cuisine terms
Japanese inventions